Merika Enne (born 24 June 1992) is a snowboarder from Finland.

References

External links
 World Snowboard Tour – Biography

1992 births
Living people
Finnish female snowboarders
Snowboarders at the 2014 Winter Olympics
Olympic snowboarders of Finland
Sportspeople from Tampere